Chien Hsin University of Science and Technology (UCH) is a university in Zhongli District, Taoyuan City, Taiwan. UCH is also known as Chien Hsin Tech.

Present situation 

UCH is noted for teaching and research in the science and engineering, especially energy engineering. Starting from 2003, the university comprises 5 colleges (Electrical Engineering and Computer Science, Engineering, Management, Commerce, Graduate Institutes), 13 departments, offering 13 master programs, and 1 Ph.D. program

History 
UCH was originally established in Shanghai in 1933 as the San Ji Telecommunication School. In 1937, signifying the end of the Second Sino-Japanese War (1937–1945). After the Chinese Civil War, the Republic of Taiwan lost control in Mainland China in 1949. UCH was re-established in 1953 in Zhongli City, Taiwan (now Zhongli District, Taoyuan).

Organization 
A president (校長) heads the university. Each college (院) is headed by a dean (院長), and each department (系) by a chairman (系主任). Students elect their own representatives each year to attend administrative meetings.

There are five colleges in UCH:

Research centers

National research centers 
E-GPS Research Center

Other centers and laboratories 
Green Energy Research Center
Logistic Management Research Center
Euro-Asia Research Center
Digital Earth and Disaster Reduction Research Center
Engineering & Environment Geophysics Laboratory

International Academic Exchanges

Dual degree 
University of Colorado at Colorado Springs, United States（3-2 programs）
Hanoi University of Business and Management, Vietnam（2-2.1-1 programs）

Partner universities 
United States
Appalachian State University
Murray State University
Saint Leo University
Russia
Moscow State University
Saint Petersburg State University
Moscow State University of Technology "Stankin"
Far Eastern State Technical University
Moscow Academy of Government and Municipal Management, MAGMU
Moscow Aviation Institute (State University of Aerospace Technology)
Moscow State University Of Culture And Arts
Moscow State Institute of Radioengeneering, Electronic and Automation
Saint Petersburg State University of Aerospace Instrumentation 
Buryat State University
United Kingdom
Aberystwyth University
Nottingham Trent University
Queen's University Belfast
Tajikistan
Russian-Tajik Slavonic University
Kazakhstan
Al - Farabi Kazakh National University
Kainar University
Kazakh Academic University
Kazakhstan Institute of Management, Economics and Strategic Research （KIMEP）
Kyrgyzstan
Institute of History National academy of science
Azerbaijan
Baku State University
Turkey
Süleyman Demirel University
South Korea
Kyungil University
Vietnam
Hanoi University of Technology
Hung Vuong University
Malaysia
Southern College
New Era College
McOrange College
Paraguay
National University of Asuncion
China
Zhengzhou University
Huazhong University of Science and Technology

Surroundings 
Jhongli Station
THSR Taoyuan Station
Chung Yuan Christian University
Ching Yun Commercial Center

Transportation
The university is accessible within walking distance South of Zhongli Station of the Taiwan Railways.

Notable alumni
 Frankie Huang, actor and television host

See also
 List of universities in Taiwan
 Education in Taiwan

References

External links 

 Chien Hsin University of Science and Technology website 
 Chien Hsin University of Science and Technology website

1953 establishments in Taiwan
Educational institutions established in 1953
Private universities and colleges in Taiwan
Universities and colleges in Taoyuan City
Zhongli District
Universities and colleges in Taiwan
Technical universities and colleges in Taiwan